Only Theatre of Pain is the first studio album by the American rock band Christian Death, released on March 24, 1982, by the Frontier record label.

It is considered by most critics to be the harbinger of the deathrock style of music, as well as being highly influential on the American gothic music scene.

Content 
Describing the album's themes, The A.V. Club said the record is "relentless in its morbid embrace of Christian eschatology. Williams was raised in a Southern Baptist family, which makes his adversarial appropriation of Catholic imagery more nuanced than simple blasphemy; he’s approaching the cross from the perspective of both Protestantism and what one can only assume to be either atheism or Satanism".

Critical reception

Only Theatre of Pain was praised by critics on its release. Mick Mercer of Melody Maker called it the "gothic album to out-gothic all others".

Around the time of its release, a presenter on a religious TV program, in a special on "Satanic influences", reportedly broke a copy of the album on air.

In its retrospective review, Record Collector wrote, "Only Theatre of Pain's influence should not be underestimated." The A.V. Club wrote that, of the group's musical peers, "none had exemplified the nascent subgenre [gothic rock] with as much sinew, vision, and iconoclasm", calling it "a depraved masterpiece".

Alex Ogg, writing in The Rough Guide to Rock, was less favourable, calling the album "self-aggrandizing doom rock redeemed only by strong musicianship".

Anniversary concert
On April 13, 2007, the remaining members of the Only Theatre of Pain line-up of Christian Death reunited as Christian Death 1334 to perform the album in full at the Henry Fonda Theatre in Los Angeles, California. The addition of "1334" to the end of the band's name was reportedly to make a distinction from the Valor Kand-led version of the band, which includes none of the group's original members; "1334" was also Rozz Williams' "signature number". At the time, it was reported by Blabbermouth that the band was working on new songs and was to begin the recording of a new album later in the year, but this never materialized.

Track listing

Personnel
 Christian Death
 Rozz Williams – lead vocals, production, sleeve drawings, cover concept
 Rikk Agnew – guitars, production
 James McGearty – bass guitars, production
 George Belanger – drums, production

 Additional personnel
 Eva O – backing vocals
 Ron Athey – backing vocals

 Technical
 Thom Wilson – production
 Ed Colver – sleeve photography

References

External links
 

1982 debut albums
Christian Death albums
Frontier Records albums
Albums produced by Thom Wilson